Jonathan Stevenson (born 13 October 1982) is an English football player-manager of  side Melton Town. as a player, he plays as a forward.

Playing career
Born in Leicester, Leicestershire, Stevenson started his career with home town side Leicester City as a trainee. Stevenson did not start a game for the club, making only 12 appearances in the league, all coming on as a substitute. His debut came against West Ham United in a FA Premier League match on 12 January 2002. He went on to score only two goals for the club; one against Aston Villa in a 2–2 draw, and the solitary goal in a 6–1 defeat at the hands of Ipswich Town.

After being released by Leicester City in June 2003, he was snapped up by Swindon Town. At Swindon he made just eight appearances, four as a substitute.

After failing to make his mark, Stevenson was signed by Cambridge City before moving on to Conference North club Alfreton Town.

After a year at Alfreton, Stevenson joined Tamworth, where he signed a 12-month deal on 18 May 2006.

On 28 June 2007, local newspaper the Tamworth Herald confirmed that Tamworth manager Gary Mills had said that Stevenson had not been offered a new deal at the club and was unlikely to receive one. Stevenson had a trial with Conference North side Hinckley United and signed for the club in July 2007.

It was confirmed on 14 September 2007 that Stevenson had left Hinckley for Conference North rivals Boston United. Stevenson began his tenure at Boston by scoring in all his first three matches. However, he departed at the end of the season.

Between 2008 and 2011. Stevenson then spent time playing for teams across the Midlands region, including Corby Town in Northamptonshire, Quorn, Halesowen Town in the West Midlands, Rothwell Town, Hinckley United and Thurmaston Town.

Between 2011-2015, Stevenson played for South Leicestershire side Oadby Town.

Managerial career

Melton Town
Stevenson, along with Tom Manship were named as player managers for Melton Town on 17 May 2018.

References

External links

1982 births
Living people
Footballers from Leicester
English footballers
Association football forwards
Leicester City F.C. players
Swindon Town F.C. players
Cambridge City F.C. players
Alfreton Town F.C. players
Tamworth F.C. players
Hinckley United F.C. players
Boston United F.C. players
Corby Town F.C. players
Quorn F.C. players
Halesowen Town F.C. players
Rothwell Town F.C. players
Oadby Town F.C. players
Shepshed Dynamo F.C. players
AFC Rushden & Diamonds players
Gresley F.C. players
Melton Town F.C. players
Melton Town F.C. managers
Premier League players
English Football League players
National League (English football) players
Southern Football League players
English football managers
East Midlands Counties Football League players
Association football player-managers